Team ColoQuick is a UCI Continental team founded in 2008 and based in Denmark. It participates in UCI Continental Circuits races.

Team roster

Major wins 

2008
 Rogaland Grand Prix, Michael Tronborg
 Prologue, Stages 2, 4 & 10, Tour of Qinghai Lake, Alex Rasmussen
 Overall Danmark Rundt, Jakob Fuglsang
2009
 Grand Prix de la Ville de Lillers, Aleksejs Saramotins
 Overall Boucle de l'Artois, Sergey Firsanov
Stage 3 Sergey Firsanov
 Stage 4 Rhône-Alpes Isère Tour, Allan Johansen
 GP Herning, René Jørgensen
 Overall Ringerike GP, Sergey Firsanov
Stage 2, Sergey Firsanov
 Stage 3 Ronde de l'Oise, Aleksejs Saramotins
 Stage 4 Ronde de l'Oise, Allan Johansen
 Designa Grandprix, Aleksejs Saramotins
 Antwerpse Havenpijl, Jens-Erik Madsen
 Druivenkoers Overijse, Aleksejs Saramotins
 Münsterland Giro, Aleksejs Saramotins
2010
 Stage 6 La Tropicale Amissa Bongo, Michael Reihs
 Overall Five Rings of Moscow, Sergey Firsanov
Stage 2, Sergey Firsanov
 Fyen Rundt, Jens-Erik Madsen
 Chrono Champenois, Rasmus Quaade
2015
 Skive–Løbet, Alexander Kamp
 GP Horsens, Alexander Kamp
 Stage 5 (ITT) Danmark Rundt, Mads Würtz Schmidt
2017
 Kalmar Grand Prix, Rasmus Bøgh Wallin
2018
 Stage 4 Tour du Loir-et-Cher, Emil Vinjebo
 Skive–Løbet, Rasmus Bøgh Wallin
2019
 Stage 5 Tour du Loir-et-Cher, Steffan Munk
 Eschborn–Frankfurt Under–23, Frederik Rodenberg
 Himmerland Rundt, Niklas Larsen
 Skive–Løbet, Frederik Rodenberg
 Stage 1a Tour de la Mirabelle, Morten Hulgaard
 Overall Danmark Rundt, Niklas Larsen
 Lillehammer GP, Niklas Larsen
2021 
 GP Herning, Mads Kristensen
 Gylne Gutuer, William Levy
2022
 Stage 3 Tour du Loir-et-Cher, Jeppe Pallesen

National champions 
2009
 Denmark U23 Time Trial, Jimmi Sørensen
2015
 Denmark U23 Time Trial, Mads Würtz
2019
 Denmark U23 Time Trial, Johan Price-Pejtersen
 European U23 Time Trial, Johan Price-Pejtersen

References

External links 

UCI Continental Teams (Europe)
Cycling teams based in Denmark
Cycling teams established in 2008